The 2002 FIBA Africa Clubs Champions Cup was the 18th FIBA Africa Basketball Club Championship, an international basketball tournament  held in Luanda, Angola from November 30 to December 7, 2002. The tournament, organized by FIBA Africa and hosted by C.D. Primeiro de Agosto, was contested by 7 clubs, in a round robin system.
 
The tournament was won by Primeiro de Agosto from host country Angola.

Participating teams

Squads

Schedule
Times given below are in UTC+1.

Day 1

Day 2

Day 3

Day 4

Day 5

Day 6

Day 7

Final standings

All Tournament Team

See also 
 2003 FIBA Africa Championship

External links 
 

2002 FIBA Africa Basketball Club Championship
2002 FIBA Africa Basketball Club Championship
Africa Basketball Club Championship
International basketball competitions hosted by Angola